Macrocheles merdarius is a species of mite in the family Macrochelidae. It is found in New Zealand and Europe.

References

merdarius
Articles created by Qbugbot
Animals described in 1889